The Saginaw and Mount Pleasant Railroad was a wholly owned subsidiary of the Flint and Pere Marquette Railroad (F&PM). It was established to construct a  railway line from a junction with the F&PM main line at Coleman, Michigan, to Mount Pleasant, Michigan. The line opened on December 15, 1879, as a  narrow gauge line. On January 31, 1889 the company was formally merged into the F&PM along with the East Saginaw and St. Clair Railroad, the Saginaw and Clare County Railroad, and the Manistee Railroad.

In 1979 the C&O abandoned the line.

Notes

References

External links 
 Interactive map of the Saginaw and Mount Pleasant Railroad.

Railway companies established in 1879
Railway companies disestablished in 1889
Defunct Michigan railroads
Narrow gauge railroads in Michigan
Predecessors of the Pere Marquette Railway
Transportation in Isabella County, Michigan
Transportation in Midland County, Michigan
3 ft gauge railways in the United States
Standard gauge railways in the United States